Majees Sports Club is an Omani sports club based in Majees. The club is currently playing in the First Division League of Oman Football Association. Their home ground is Sohar Regional Sports Complex. The stadium is government owned, but they also own their own personal stadium and sports equipments, as well as their own training facilities.

History
The club won the First Division league of Oman Football Association in 2004. Majees SC then played in the 2005–06 season and in the 2006–07 season in the Omani League. In the 2006–07 season, they got relegated to the Second Division. The club got promoted to the Oman Professional League again after they became the runners-up of the 2012-13 First Division League.

Being a multisport club
Although being mainly known for their football, Majees SC like many other clubs in Oman, have not only football in their list, but also hockey, volleyball, handball, basketball, badminton and squash. They also have a youth football team competing in the Omani Youth league.

Colors, kit providers and sponsors
Majees SC have been known since establishment to wear a full blue or white (Away) kit (usually a lighter shade of blue). They have also had many different sponsors over the years. As of now, Adidas provides them with kits.

Honours and achievements

National titles

Oman First Division League (0):
Runners-up 2012–13

References

External links
Mjees SC Profile at Soccerway.com
Mjees SC Profile at Goalzz.com

Football clubs in Oman
Oman Professional League
Association football clubs established in 1979
1979 establishments in Oman